The Tararua District is a district near the south-east corner of New Zealand's North Island that is administered by the Tararua District Council. The Tararua District Council was created by the amalgamation of the Dannevirke Borough, Eketahuna County Council, Pahiatua Borough Council, Pahiatua County Council and Woodville District Council in the 1989 local government reforms.

The district's northwest boundary runs along the top of the Ruahine Range; its south-east boundary is the Pacific Ocean. The catchment of the Manawatu River generally defines the north and south extremities. The catchment is also the reason the majority of the district is in the Manawatū-Whanganui Region, although traditionally many of the people of the district regard themselves as living in either Hawke's Bay (in the north) or Wairarapa (in the south).

Towns and regional government 
The district's chief town is Dannevirke, settled by immigrants from Denmark in the 19th century. It is also the centre for a Community Board. Other towns (from south to north along the main valleys) include Eketahuna and Pahiatua, which have their own Community Boards, and Woodville, Ormondville, and Norsewood. Near the coast are Pongaroa, Herbertville, Ākitio, and Alfredton.

While the vast majority (98.42% by land area) of Tararua District is part of the Manawatū-Whanganui Region, a small triangle of rural land (1.58% by land area) north of the Owahanga River in the southeast of the district is part of Wellington Region. According to the 2006 Census this area, known as Mara, has only 3 residents (down from 12 in 1996 and 2001).

Dannevirke County Council 
Dannevirke County Council was formed in 1907 by splitting Waipawa County Council. It lasted until 1987, when it amalgamated with Dannevirke Borough Council to form Dannevirke District Council, which lasted 2 years until becoming part of Tararua District. Norsewood Town Board was added to DCC in 1936, Ormondville Town Board in 1944, Weber County in 1956 and Ākitio County in 1976. In its final form DCC had five ridings, Ākitio, Weber, Mangapuaka, Norsewood and Ruahine. The County Office was at Barraud Street, Dannevirke. In 1911 it was a single storey, wooden building.

Demographics

Tararua District had a population of 17,943 at the 2018 New Zealand census, an increase of 1,089 people (6.5%) since the 2013 census, and an increase of 309 people (1.8%) since the 2006 census. There were 6,996 households. There were 8,916 males and 9,027 females, giving a sex ratio of 0.99 males per female. The median age was 41.8 years (compared with 37.4 years nationally), with 3,876 people (21.6%) aged under 15 years, 2,883 (16.1%) aged 15 to 29, 7,899 (44.0%) aged 30 to 64, and 3,285 (18.3%) aged 65 or older.

Ethnicities were 84.5% European/Pākehā, 24.6% Māori, 1.9% Pacific peoples, 2.7% Asian, and 1.4% other ethnicities. People may identify with more than one ethnicity.

The percentage of people born overseas was 8.7, compared with 27.1% nationally.

Although some people objected to giving their religion, 49.6% had no religion, 36.7% were Christian, 0.3% were Hindu, 0.2% were Muslim, 0.3% were Buddhist and 4.5% had other religions.

Of those at least 15 years old, 1,431 (10.2%) people had a bachelor or higher degree, and 3,897 (27.7%) people had no formal qualifications. The median income was $26,300, compared with $31,800 nationally. 1,374 people (9.8%) earned over $70,000 compared to 17.2% nationally. The employment status of those at least 15 was that 6,459 (45.9%) people were employed full-time, 2,298 (16.3%) were part-time, and 567 (4.0%) were unemployed.

"Forty-Mile Bush" 
When Europeans settled the area, it was almost entirely forested and was called "Forty-Mile Bush". Industrious clearance has made it a busy pastoral district, although the region close to the Pacific coast is still sparsely populated. The original name lives on in that of the local National Provincial Championship rugby union team, Wairarapa-Bush.

Economy 
Agriculture is the district's main industry. Other industries include textiles, food processing, and retailing. Commercial forestry is expected to become more important to the district's economy in the next few years.

Weather forecasts 
Before 2006, weather forecasts on National Radio (as provided by MetService) had usually mentioned Hawke's Bay and Wairarapa but rarely if ever Tararua District, probably leaving Tararua District residents wondering which applied to them when the forecasts differed.

Officially it is considered a sub-region of the Wairarapa district. Since early in 2006, Met Service policy is that a separate Tararua District forecast will be issued only if the expected weather in that area differs significantly from the other sub-regions (Masterton, Carterton, and South Wairarapa). However, by the time the forecast is actually broadcast over National Radio (at least until early March 2006), Tararua District is simply listed as a separate District if it is mentioned at all (commonly in the phrase "Tararua and Wairarapa"), and if it is mentioned separately or bracketed with other areas apart from Wairarapa there is no indication that the Wairarapa forecast excludes Tararua District.

Schools

Secondary:
 Tararua College, Pahiatua (Year 9-15)
 Dannevirke High School, Dannevirke (Year 9-15)
 Totara College of Accelerated Learning Mangatera, Dannevirke (Year 1-15)
Te Kura Kaupapa Maori o Tamaki Nui A Rua, Dannevirke (Years 1-15)

Primary:

Norsewood and District, Norsewood (Year 1-8)
Kumeroa School, Kumeroa (Year 1-8)
 Huia Range Dannevirke (Year 1-8)
 Dannevirke South School (Year 1-8)
 St Joseph School Dannevirke (Year 1-8)
 Ruahine School Dannevirke (Year 1-8)
 Woodville School, Woodville
 Eketahuna School, Eketahuna (Year 1-8)
 Alfredton School, Alfredton (Year 1-8)
Ballance School, Woodville (Year 1-8)
Makuri School (Year 1-8)
Mangatainoka School (Year 1-8)
Pahiatua School (Year 1-8)
Papatawa School (Year 1-8)
Pongaroa School (Year 1-8)
St Anthony's School (Pahiatua) (Year 1-8)
Weber School (Year 1-8)

References

External links 

Forty or more categorised profiles of relevant websites
District Council website